Tamara Tunie (born March 14, 1959) is an American film, stage, and television actress, director, and producer. She is best known for her roles as attorney Jessica Griffin on the CBS soap opera As the World Turns (1987–1995, 2000–2007, 2009) and as medical examiner Melinda Warner in the NBC police drama Law & Order: Special Victims Unit (2000–2021).

Tunie has appeared in a number of movies, including Wall Street (1987), Rising Sun (1993), The Devil's Advocate (1997), Flight (2012), and A Journal for Jordan (2021). She received a Independent Spirit Award for Best Supporting Female nomination for her performance in the 2001 drama film The Caveman's Valentine. In 2010, she made her directing debut with romantic comedy film See You in September. Tunie also received the Tony Award for Best Musical in 2007 for producing Spring Awakening and Obie Award for Distinguished Performance by an Actress in 2016 for Familiar.

Early life
Tunie was born in McKeesport, Pennsylvania, and grew up in Homestead, the daughter of Evelyn (née Hawkins) and James W. Tunie. She has a Bachelor of Fine Arts in Musical Theatre from Carnegie Mellon University in Pittsburgh, Pennsylvania. She was a contestant in the Miss Black Teenage Pageant in Pittsburgh in the early 1970s.

Career
Tunie made her Broadway debut alongside Lena Horne in Lena Horne: The Lady and Her Music in 1981. From 1987 to 1995, she starred in the CBS daytime soap opera As the World Turns playing attorney Jessica Griffin. She reprised the role from 2000 to 2007, receiving NAACP Image Awards nominations for Outstanding Actress in a Daytime Drama Series in 2003 and 2004. In the 1990s. Tunie guest-starred in primetime dramas including Swift Justice, Law & Order, Chicago Hope, New York Undercover, and Sex and the City. She also had a recurring role as Lillian Fancy in the ABC police drama NYPD Blue from 1994 to 1997.

Tunie has had supporting roles in a number of movies. She made her film debut in Sweet Lorraine opposite Maureen Stapleton and later appeared in Wall Street (1987). Tunie worked twice with Al Pacino; she portrayed his press secretary in the film City Hall (1996) and the possessed wife of a partner in his law firm in the film The Devil's Advocate (1997). Her other credits include Bloodhounds of Broadway (1989), Rising Sun (1993), Eve's Bayou (1997), The Peacemaker (1997), and Snake Eyes (1998). In 2001, she received a nomination for the Independent Spirit Awards for her role in film The Caveman's Valentine, based on George Dawes Green's eponymous novel, opposite Samuel L. Jackson.

In 2000, Tunie joined the cast of NBC police procedural series Law & Order: Special Victims Unit as medical examiner Melinda Warner. She made her debut as Warner in the second-season episode titled "Noncompliance" and continued to make recurring appearances until Season 7, when she became a regular cast member. She also played this role in Law & Order: Trial by Jury in episode "Day" in 2005, and in the Chicago Fire episode "We Called Her Jellybean" in 2015. Tunie was regular on SVU from Season 7 to 12 and later made recurring appearances to Season 17. She later appeared in episodes in 2018 and 2019, totaling 223 credited episodes.

In 2002, Tunie played Alberta Green in the first season of the Fox thriller series 24. In 2010, she made her directing debut with romantic comedy film See You in September. In 2012, she returned to film, playing Margaret Thomason in the Robert Zemeckis-directed drama Flight starring Denzel Washington. From 2014 to 2015, she was regular cast member in the Sundance TV drama series The Red Road.

Tunie won a Tony Award in 2007 for the production of the Broadway musical Spring Awakening; she has also won a Drama Desk Award. In 2016, she won an Obie Award for Distinguished Performance in Familiar, written by Danai Gurira.

From 2016 to 2018, Tunie had a recurring role as Monica Graham in the CBS police drama series Blue Bloods. In 2018, she was regular cast member in two series, ABC comedy-drama Dietland and BBC Two/Netflix co-produced drama Black Earth Rising. In the latter she played Eunice Clayton, US Assistant Secretary of State for African Affairs. Her other television credits include The Good Wife, Survivor's Remorse, Better Call Saul, and Almost Family. Tunie also played Gugu Mbatha-Raw's mother in the 2018 romantic comedy-drama film Irreplaceable You. In 2022, she appeared as Cissy Houston in the biographical drama film Whitney Houston: I Wanna Dance with Somebody  directed by Kasi Lemmons.

In 2022 she played Kamala Harris in The 47th at The Old Vic theatre in London.

Personal life
Tunie was married to Greg Bouquett from 1988 to 1991. From 1995 to 2018, she was married to jazz musician Gregory Generet. They separated in 2015.

Filmography

Film

Television

As a director

Awards and nominations

References

External links 
 
 

1959 births
Living people
Actresses from Pennsylvania
African-American actresses
American soap opera actresses
American television actresses
Drama Desk Award winners
Tony Award winners
Carnegie Mellon University College of Fine Arts alumni
People from Homestead, Pennsylvania
People from McKeesport, Pennsylvania